Qeshlaq-e Shah Khanem may refer to:
Qeshlaq-e Shah Khanem Ali Borat
Qeshlaq-e Shah Khanem Qadir